Vice Admiral Henry Allan Porter CMM, CD (17 August 1922 – 13 March 2016) was a Canadian Forces officer who served as Commander Maritime Command from 6 July 1970 to 18 October 1971.

Career
Porter joined the Royal Canadian Navy as an ordinary telegraphist in 1939 and underwent seamanship training before serving as communications officer in HMCS Kootenay during the Second World War. He became Commanding Officer of the frigate  in 1952, Commanding Officer of the frigate  in 1953 and officer in charge of the Communications School on the East Coast in 1954. He went on to be Director of Naval Communications at Naval Headquarters in 1955, Commander Fourth Canadian Escort Squadron in 1958 and Naval Advisor to the Chief of Personnel at the National Defence Headquarters in 1964. After that he became Commanding Officer of the aircraft carrier  in 1965, Director-General Maritime Forces in 1966 and Director-General Equipment Requirements in 1968. He continued his career becoming Senior Canadian Officer Afloat Atlantic in 1968, Commander Maritime Forces Pacific in 1969 and Commander Maritime Command in 1970. His last appointments were as Comptroller General Canadian Armed Forces in 1971 and Assistant Deputy Minister (Evaluation) in 1972 before retiring in 1974. He retired to Chester, Nova Scotia and died on 13 March 2016.

Awards and decorations
Porter's personal awards and decorations include the following:
130px

135px

References

1922 births
2016 deaths
Canadian admirals
Royal Canadian Navy officers
Commanders of the Order of Military Merit (Canada)
Commanders of the Royal Canadian Navy
Royal Canadian Navy personnel of World War II
Canadian military personnel from British Columbia